Lürən (also, Lyuran) is a village and municipality in the Masally Rayon of Azerbaijan.  It has a population of 869.

References

Əhalisinin məşğuliyyəti 
Əhali əsasən kənd təsərrüfatı və maldarlıqla məşğul olur.

Populated places in Masally District